The 2011 TAIYEN William Jones Cup was the 33rd tournament of the William Jones Cup that took place at the Hsinchuang Gymnasium in New Taipei, Republic of China (commonly known as Taiwan) from August 6 to 13, 2011.

Men's tournament

Squads
South Africa had committed a week prior to the tournament but withdrew to funding problems. UAE, on the other hand, made their tournament debut. Unlike the previous tournament, which had a round robin tournament format, this year's event features a medal round after the preliminary round robin to determine a champion.

Preliminary round

 Head-to-head record
All times in UTC+8.

Semifinals

Finals

Brackets

Championship bracket

Fifth-place bracket

Final standings

Awards

Women's tournament

Awards

Note: As combined Chinese Taipei national team. Chinese Taipei Blue won the 2004 edition.

References

External links
Official website 

2011
2011–12 in Taiwanese basketball
2011–12 in Asian basketball